Michael Murphy (born 8 September 1965) is a former Australian rules footballer who played with the North Melbourne Football Club, Adelaide Football Club and the Brisbane Bears in the Victorian/Australian Football League (VFL/AFL).

Murphy, a key position player from Renmark, came to North Melbourne after being selected with the ninth pick of the 1987 VFL Draft. He played three times in the 1988 VFL season then returned to the club he was recruited from, Glenelg in the SANFL. Murphy was a centre half back in the 1990 Grand Final, which Glenelg lost to Port Adelaide. His performances during the year saw him make the Adelaide Football Club's squad for their entry into the AFL in 1991.

In just his second game, Murphy kicked a bag of six goals against Footscray at Football Park. He however struggled throughout the season with injuries and discipline, missing a total of seven games through suspension from three visits to the tribunal. In 1992 he again made few appearances, but managed an accurate 23 goals and three behinds.

Having been let go by Adelaide, he was picked up by Brisbane with the 81st pick of the 1992 AFL Draft. His biggest contribution came in the club's record 219 to 57 points win over Sydney at the Gabba, where both he and Roger Merrett booted eight goals

According to afl.com Murphy was the most accurate scorer the game has seen amongst players with at least 50 scoring shots, with 76.83% of his shots at goal scoring a goal.

References

1965 births
North Melbourne Football Club players
Adelaide Football Club players
Brisbane Bears players
Glenelg Football Club players
Australian rules footballers from South Australia
Living people